Jews for Judaism is an international organization that focuses on preventing Jews from converting to other faiths and reclaiming those who have already converted. It provides counseling services, education, and outreach programs to all Jewish denominations. It was established in 1985 by Rabbi Bentzion Kravitz.

The name Jews for Judaism was developed from "Jews for Jesus", one of the principal missionary organizations it was founded to counteract. One of its prominent early members, Larry Levey, was a Jewish convert to Christianity who then converted back to Judaism and led the Baltimore office of Jews for Judaism for a number of years. In addition to its activities in response to Christian missionaries, Jews for Judaism has also been noted for its critiques of the Kabbalah Centre.

Offices
Jews for Judaism has two North American offices, located in Los Angeles, California, United States, and Toronto, Ontario, Canada.

Directors

Los Angeles, California, United States: Rabbi Bentzion Kravitz.
Toronto, Ontario, Canada: Julius Ciss, a former "Messianic Jew".

"Be-True"
Jews for Judaism formed the student organization, "Be-True", as a response to missionary activity on university campuses. The organization runs primarily through student representative volunteers. There are currently "Be-True" representatives in the United States, Canada, and Australia.

See also 

 Tovia Singer
 Penina Taylor
 Yad L'Achim

References

External links 
Jews for Judaism website
Jews for Judaism Australian website
Jews for Judaism Student website
Judaism and Jewish Resources

Charities based in California
Jewish apologetics
Jewish charities based in the United States
Jewish counter-missionaries
Organizations established in 1985
Orthodox Jewish outreach
1985 establishments in California